Diaphus mascarensis is a species of lanternfish found in the Western Indian Ocean.

Size

References

Myctophidae
Taxa named by Vladimir Eduardovich Becker
Fish described in 1990